Sujata Choudhury (born June 27, 1984), credited professionally as Sujata Day, is an American actress, model and screenwriter. She is best known for her roles as CeeCee in the Issa Rae web series, The Misadventures of Awkward Black Girl (2011-2013) and Sarah in Insecure. Day made her directorial debut with the 2020 comedy-drama, Definition Please.

Early life

The daughter of an India-born mechanical engineer and a housewife, Sujata became involved in the performing arts at a very young age. She began with dance (ballet, jazz, modern, hip hop, and East Indian folk and classical dance) and then became equally interested in acting, singing and musical theater. She continued to study and perform in school and community productions before heading west to pursue a professional acting career in Hollywood.

Career
Sujata has appeared in a wide variety of television shows such as The Secret Life of the American Teenager, Campus Ladies, Buffy the Vampire Slayer, 7th Heaven, Greek, and The Loop. In 2007, she played a supporting role in the Warner Bros.-produced Sublime. She can be seen alongside Danny Glover and Snoop Doggy Dogg in the independent film Down for Life which premiered to rave reviews at the 2009 Toronto International Film Festival.

In 2009 she appeared in the horror/comedy film The Last Lovecraft: Relic of Cthulhu, which screened at the 2010 Slamdance Film Festival.

She starred as CeCe in the Issa Rae-created web comedy series The Misadventures of Awkward Black Girl. She continued her work with Rae on the HBO series, Insecure.

In 2017, Day wrote, produced, directed and starred in a film called Cowboy and Indian, to be developed into a television series.

On May 30, 2019, it was announced that Day will direct a film called Definition Please, for which she also wrote the script. It stars Ritesh Rajan and Jake Choi and was shot on location in Greensburg, Pennsylvania in the summer of 2019.

Filmography

Film

Television

Video games

Production

References

External links

Actresses from Pennsylvania
American film actresses
American stage actresses
American television actresses
American actresses of Indian descent
Living people
1984 births
21st-century American actresses
American women film directors